Trachystemon is a monotypic genus of flowering plants belonging to the family Boraginaceae. The only species is Trachystemon orientalis, commonly known as Abraham-Isaac-Jacob or early-flowering borage.

Its native range is Bulgaria to Turkey. 

It is a perennial herb of the family Boraginaceae. It is frequently grown as an ornamental for its early blue-violet flowers and large leaves. It quickly spreads to provide a dense groundcover. "Trachystemon" is derived from the Greek "trachys", meaning rough, and "stemon", a stamen. The specific epithet, "orientalis" means eastern or from the orient, and is a reference to the native distribution of this species. Trachystemon orientalis is endemic to southeastern Europe and western Asia.

References

External links

Boraginoideae
Boraginaceae genera
Monotypic asterid genera